The River Mall is a shopping center in Pudong, Shanghai, China. The shopping center is located along the Expo Axis at the former area of Expo 2010.

Architecture
The shopping center consists of five floors over five areas.

Transportation
The shopping center is accessible within walking distance west of China Art Museum Station of Shanghai Metro.

See also
 Expo 2010

References

External links
  

Shopping malls in Shanghai
Pudong
Expo 2010